Sherman Lewis (born June 29, 1942) is a former American football coach and player. He spent thirty-four years as a coach, but had been out of football since the end of the 2004 season before joining the Washington Redskins mid-way into the 2009 season. He attended Michigan State University as an undergrad and later received his graduate degree in education administration.

Career
Lewis began his football career at Michigan State as a halfback. He was named to the College Football All-America Team and finished third behind winner Roger Staubach and runner-up Billy Lothridge for the Heisman Trophy in 1963. His professional playing career included parts of the 1964 and 1965 seasons with the Toronto Argonauts of the Canadian Football League. He also played the 1966 and 1967 seasons with the New York Jets of the American Football League (when the AFL was absorbed by, but not yet merged with, the National Football League).

After a brief career as a professional football player, he was hired as an assistant coach for the football team at his alma mater, Michigan State, from 1969 through 1982. He went on to become the running backs coach for Bill Walsh, under whom the San Francisco 49ers won three Super Bowls. In 1992, he became the offensive coordinator for the Green Bay Packers under head coach Mike Holmgren.

In October 2009, Lewis had come out of retirement and was hired by the Washington Redskins to serve as an offensive consultant for the team under head coach Jim Zorn. He eventually began to call plays for the team, after Redskins general manager Vinny Cerrato had taken away those duties from Zorn.

References

1942 births
Living people
All-American college football players
African-American coaches of American football
African-American players of Canadian football
African-American players of American football
American Football League players
Detroit Lions coaches
Green Bay Packers coaches
Minnesota Vikings coaches
San Francisco 49ers coaches
Washington Redskins coaches
Michigan State University alumni
Michigan State Spartans football players
National Football League offensive coordinators
New York Jets players
Toronto Argonauts players
Sportspeople from Louisville, Kentucky
Players of American football from Louisville, Kentucky
Players of Canadian football from Louisville, Kentucky
DuPont Manual High School alumni
21st-century African-American people
20th-century African-American sportspeople